Meydavud or Meidavood or Mey Davuud or Meydavod or Mai Daud may refer to:
 Meydavud District, a district Khuzestan Province, Iran
 Meydavud Rural District, a sub-district of  Meydavud District
 Meydavud-e Olya, a village in Meydavud Rural District, Iran
 Meydavud-e Sofla, a village in Meydavud Rural District, Iran
Meydavud-e Vosta, a village in Meydavud Rural District, Iran